The Panda Game is a Canadian rivalry football game between the two OUA football teams in Ottawa, Ontario, the University of Ottawa Gee-Gees and Carleton University Ravens. It is one of the oldest and richest rivalries in Canadian university football. Its name is derived from the trophy presented to the winner each year; Pedro the Panda. The game is part of the regular East division season, but is celebrated profusely due to its history, the week preceding the game sometimes referred to as "Panda Week". uOttawa is located in the downtown Sandy Hill neighbourhood of the city, while Carleton is between Old Ottawa South and Dow's Lake.

Creation and further history
In 1955, Bryan McNulty, a University of Ottawa student and associate editor for the Fulcrum and Thomas White, decided to promote the rivalry between their school and Carleton University. They asked a local jeweller, Jack Snow, to donate a stuffed panda that would be named "Pedro" to be used as a Gee-Gee mascot (as they had not adopted the Gee-Gee horse mascot yet). McNulty and White later convinced Snow to display the panda in his front window and then organized the first "Pandanapping", a ritual in which Pedro would be stolen from each campus in various ways. "Pandanapping" would progress over the years to the point where major vandalism was involved and almost jeopardized the game's future.

In a short matter of time, both Pedro and the Panda Game itself became national icons. In 1958, after a 25–0 Gee-Gee victory, Pedro went on a world tour. He made visits to McGill University in Montréal, Dalhousie University in Halifax, the University of Western Ontario in London, Ontario, the University of British Columbia in Vancouver, UCLA in Los Angeles, and Alabama State University in Montgomery. It is said that Pedro was even sent to Peru, Mexico and Europe.

The game quickly became the most well-known football game in Canada behind the Grey Cup and the Vanier Cup. The attendance at the Panda Game one year exceeded 16,000, which was higher than that of the Vanier Cup that same season.

1987 tragedy
By the time the 1980s had come, the Panda Game had gained a reputation for being a drunken party more than a football game.

The 1987 edition brought heavily packed stands. Dozens of fans leaned up against a railing, causing it to collapse. 30 Ravens fans fell roughly 16 feet onto concrete. Many students sustained broken bones and concussions, while one female student broke her neck and spent 20 days in a coma.

The future of the Panda Game was in doubt after the incident, but the tradition ultimately carried on. The 1988 game was heavily monitored by police and there was a general lack of enthusiasm about the event.

Cancellation, eventual return
The aging stadium at Lansdowne Park fell into disrepair in the 1990's. The folding of the Ottawa Rough Riders in 1996 left the venue without a full-time tenant. As it was economically unfeasible to maintain the venue so as to safely host a single football game annually, the game was moved to Carleton's Keith Harris Stadium in 1997.

The resulting loss of revenue aggravated an already precarious financial situation for Carleton's football team. In 1998, Carleton University decided to cancel their football program at the end of the season after numerous years of sustained financial losses. This decision rendered the Panda Game tradition dead and left the Gee-Gees as the lone collegiate football team in the city for the first time in 53 years.

The late 2000s brought rumours that Carleton may once again look to field a football team sometime in the near future. Meanwhile, serious plans to rebuild and modernize the facilities at Lansdowne Park were put into place. After years of planning, in 2013 the Ravens once again took the field and would mark the return of the Panda Game tradition. 2013's Panda Game was a success with approximately 4,000 fans packing the brand-new Gee-Gees Field, the game resulted in the Gee-Gees getting their hands on a Pedro trophy after a dominant 35–10 win.

Return to Lansdowne Park

It was announced that the 2014 Panda Game was to be held at the newly renovated 24,000 seat TD Place Stadium, thus returning the game to its former home at Lansdowne Park.

The Panda Game in 2014 was another wildly successful venture, the use of the modernized facility saw the crowd grow to 12,000 as the Ravens came away with a last second Hail Mary catch to win the game 33–31. Fans immediately stormed the field, and to this day the game remains unfinished, as the extra point was never attempted among the frenzy.

The 2015 edition saw a then-record attendance of 17,596. It was also the highest scoring Panda Game of all time with a combined score of 93 points, crushing the previous record of 77 points in 1975.

In 2016, the No. 7 ranked Gee-Gees came into the game undefeated (4–0) as they faced the No. 10 Ravens (3–2). Surpassing the previous season's record attendance mark, the 2016 Panda Game was a sellout as 23,329 fans watched Carleton defeat Ottawa 43–23. It was the most attended U Sports football regular season football game in at least two decades.

The 2020 Panda Game was cancelled due to the COVID-19 pandemic. Following the 2021 Panda Game, there were serious disturbances in Sandy Hill, resulting in several arrests and criminal charges. For the 2022 edition of the game, police have said they will increase their presence in the affected neighbourhood while officials threatened to cancel future Panda Games if such disturbances were repeated. There were disturbances in Sandy Hill after the 2022 game, leading to seven arrests.

Game results

See also
 Capital Hoops Classic

Notes

References

College sports rivalries in Canada
Carleton Ravens football
Ottawa Gee-Gees football
1955 establishments in Ontario
Carleton University
University of Ottawa